Adhipathi is a 2001 Indian Telugu-language action film, produced by Mohan Babu under his Sree Lakshmi Prasanna Pictures banner and directed by Ravi Raja Pinisetty. It stars Mohan Babu, Nagarjuna, Preeti Jhangiani and Soundarya, with music composed by Koti. The film is a remake of the Malayalam film Narasimham (2000).

Plot 
Yogendra is the son of Panduranga Rao, a High Court judge who got the first rank in civil services examinations. Dunnapothula Janardhan Rao, a politician, falsely implicates Yogi in a murder case to take revenge on Panduranga Rao, who had earlier given a jail sentence to him in a corruption case. Panduranga Rao gives the judgment for his son by jailing him for six years. After six years, Janardhan Rao dies on the same day when Yogi is released from jail. Dunnapothula Dharma Rao, Janardhan Rao's son, visits the shores of Godavari River to leave the ashes. Yogi foils the rites by resisting, then Dharma Rao challenges Yogi that he is going to mix the ashes of his father in the Godavari before Yogi mixes the ashes of his father, who is still alive, one day. Meanwhile, Yogi falls in love with Anuradha, the strong-willed and independent-minded daughter of Kaasi Visweswara Rao, Dharma Rao's henchman.
 
Suddenly, there is an appearance of a girl named Thulasi (Seema), who claims to be Panduranga Rao's daughter, but Panduranga Rao flatly refuses the claim and banishes her. Forced by circumstances and at the instigation help of Dharma Rao, she reluctantly comes out open with the parentage claim. Yogi at first thrashes the protesters, but upon knowing the truth from his uncle Gnaneswara Rao, he accepts the task of her protection in the capacity as her elder brother. Yogi decides to marry Thulasi to his good friend. He also confronts his father and prods him to accept his mistake and acknowledge his parentage to Thulasi. Panduranga Rao ultimately regrets and secretly goes on to confess to his daughter. The very next morning when Yogi returns home, Thulasi is found dead. Panduranga Rao is accused of murdering her, but the whole act was planned by Dharma Rao, who, after killing Thulasi, forces Satya Murthy, Panduranga Rao's longtime servant, to testify against Panduranga Rao in court. In court, Jagan, a close friend of Yogi and famous leading criminal lawyer, appears as the defense council by cancelling his marriage with his girlfriend for friendship and wins the case to lay bare the murder plot and the hidden intentions of the baddies.

Finally, Panduranga Rao is judged innocent of the crime by the court. After that, Yogi returns to his father, who now shows remorse for all his actions, including not believing in his son's innocence. He then dies at Yogi's feet. At Panduranga Rao's funeral, Dharma Rao arrives to poke fun at Yogi and also tries to carry out Janardhan Rao's postponed last rituals. Yogi interrupts the ritual and avenges for the deaths of his sister and father with Jagan's help.

Cast 

Mohan Babu as Yogindra / Yogi
Nagarjuna as Jagan
Preeti Jhangiani as Anuradha
Soundarya as Jagan's fiancé
Mukesh Rishi as Dunnapothula Dharma Rao
Vijayakumar as Justice Panduranga Rao
Dasari Narayana Rao as Judge
Kota Srinivasa Rao as Gnaneswara Rao
Brahmanandam as S.I. Pathodi
Ali
Narra Venkateswara Rao as Dunnapothula Janardhan Rao
Seema as Thulasi
Raghunatha Reddy as Kaasi Visweswara Rao
Suthi Velu as Satya Murthy
Brahmaji as Yogi's friend
Tanikella Bharani as Lawyer
Banerjee as S.P. Ashok
Venniradai Nirmala as Lakshmi
Jayalalita as Mangala
Jaya Prakash Reddyas Surya Prakash
L. B. Sriram as Papa Rao
Mohan Raj as Gajendra
M. S. Narayana
AVS
Chitti Babu
Gajar Khan as C.I. Shankar Narayan
Navabharat Balaji as Krishna Murthy
Gadiraju Subba Rao
Vijaya
Devisri
Shobha Rani
Aruna Charlla
Ooma Chowdary
Alphonsa as item number

Soundtrack 

Music composed by Koti. Music released on TIPS Audio Company.

Other 
 VCDs & DVDs on – SHALIMAR Video Company, Hyderabad

References

External links 

2001 films
2000s Telugu-language films
Telugu remakes of Malayalam films
Indian courtroom films
Films about corruption in India
Films scored by Koti
Films directed by Ravi Raja Pinisetty